Helmi Maati (died 6 July 1997) was an Egyptian footballer. He competed in the men's tournament at the 1948 Summer Olympics.

References

External links
 

Year of birth missing
1997 deaths
Egyptian footballers
Egypt international footballers
Olympic footballers of Egypt
Footballers at the 1948 Summer Olympics
Association football midfielders
Al Ahly SC players